Mohan Bhakri was a popular B movie producer and director in the 1980s. He produced many Hindi B movies, mostly in the horror genre. He is best known for his two horror films, Apradhi Kaun? (1982) and Cheekh (1984).

Filmography 
 Ab Tumhari Bari
 Woh Bewafa Thi
 Apradhi Kaun? (1982)
 Insaan Bana Shaitan
 Roohani Taaqat
 Vyah Da Dhol
 Maula Jatt
 Amavas Ki Raat
 Khooni Murdaa
 Sau Saal Baad
 Paanch Fauladi
 Kabrastan (1988)
 Padosi Ki Biwi
 Paanch Fauladi
 Khooni Mahal
 Jag Chanan Hoya
 Cheekh (1984)
 Jeeja Sali
 Do Madari
 Vohti Hath Soti
 Jatt Da Gandasa
 Jatti

References

Year of birth missing (living people)
Living people
Hindi film producers
Hindi-language film directors